Ördögi angyal is the debut studio album by Hungarian singer Magdi Rúzsa, released on November 20, 2006, by CLS Records. The translated title reads Devilish Angel. It debuted at number one on Mahasz album chart and has been certified double-platinum in Hungary. Its first single was "Aprócska blues".

Track listing
 Aprócska blues - 2:59
 Csak a zene - 4:55
 Hip-hop - 3:43
 Nem vagyok jó neked - 2:56
 Új nap - 3:07
 Eltévedt idegen - 4:22
 Ciki ez a helyzet - 3:22
 Álomangyal - 3:45
 Szembejövő sáv - 2:57
 Nem baj - 2:40
 Nekem nem szabad - 3:33
 Még egy dal - 3:44
 A sors a neved - 4:13
 Vigyázz a madárra - 4:38

References

2006 albums
Magdi Rúzsa albums